Njarar or Njars were an ancient Germanic people of Närke, Sweden,  that appears in the Scandinavian version of the Lay of Weyland the smith. In the early part of the lay, King Níðuðr is introduced as a king in Sweden:

Later he is specified as the lord of the Njars:

The Njars probably lost their independence early to the Swedish king at Uppsala, and they are not mentioned by Jordanes in his thorough listing of tribes in Scandza, in the sixth century. There are few mentions of the Njarar/Nerikjar in Old Norse sources, but for exceptions see King of Nerike.

Linguistic notes
At first glance, the name is hard to recognize, because the people of Nerike are otherwise called the Nerikjar in Old Norse sources. However, njar is a breaking of an older ner. The same sound change happened with eka and hertõ which resulted in jag (I) and hjarta (heart). However, in the case of Njar, the sound change never became established, and the older form ner continued to be used for the province and its population.

Ner is, in its turn, an umlaut from an older nar which is cognate to English narrow. The name referred to the narrow inlets that characterized the geography. The north-eastern (Kvismaren-Hjälmaren) has disappeared artificially, but the southern part of the province still has a large fjord.

See also
 List of Germanic tribes

Early Germanic peoples
Närke